The statue of Alois Jirásek is an outdoor sculpture by Karel Pokorný and Jaroslav Fragner, installed in Prague, Czech Republic.

External links

 

Monuments and memorials in Prague
Outdoor sculptures in Prague
Sculptures of men in Prague
Statues in Prague
New Town, Prague